The black-capped apalis (Apalis nigriceps) is a species of bird in the family Cisticolidae.
It is sparsely distributed throughout the tropical rainforest of Sub-Saharan Africa.

References

black-capped apalis
Birds of the African tropical rainforest
Birds of the Gulf of Guinea
black-capped apalis
Taxonomy articles created by Polbot